Kurtus indicus, the Indian humphead, is a species of fish in the family Kurtidae native to fresh, brackish, and marine waters of the coastal regions of southern Asia from India to southeast China and Indonesia. Although it has been suggested that the male carries the egg cluster on a hook protruding from the forehead (as known from K. gulliveri), available evidence strongly suggests this is not the case in K. indicus: Out of several thousand examined, none carried eggs in this manner and the male's hook is likely also too small. The female lacks the hook entirely. It is of minor importance to local commercial fisheries.

References

Kurtidae
Fish described in 1786